Barnwell Elementary School can refer to several United States schools:
Barnwell Elementary School in Johns Creek, Georgia, of Fulton County School System
Barnwell Elementary School in Barnwell, South Carolina, of Barnwell School District